Statistics of Superettan in season 2008.

Overview
It was contested by 16 teams, and Örgryte IS won the championship.

League table

Relegation play-offs

Jönköpings Södra stays in, Vasalund is promoted to, Superettan.

Öster stays in, Limhamn Bunkeflo is relegated to Division 1.

Season statistics

Top scorers

Top assists

Top goalkeepers
(Minimum of 10 games played)

Footnotes

References
Sweden - List of final tables (Clas Glenning)

Superettan seasons
2
Sweden
Sweden